"Llegaste a Mi" (English: "You Came to Me") is a song written by Omar Alfanno and performed by American singer Marc Anthony on his studio album Todo a Su Tiempo (1995) and was released as the fifth single from the album. The song is dedicated to his daughter Arianna Muñiz. It became his fifth number song on the Tropical Airplay chart in the US. The track was nominated in the category of Tropical Song of the Year at the 9th Annual Lo Nuestro Awards in 1997, ultimately losing to "La Morena" by Ilegales. It was recognized as recognized as one of the best-performing songs of the year at the 1997 ASCAP Latin Awards on the tropical field.

Charts

Weekly charts

Year-end charts

See also
List of Billboard Tropical Airplay number ones of 1996

References

1995 songs
1996 singles
Marc Anthony songs
Songs written by Omar Alfanno
Song recordings produced by Sergio George
RMM Records singles